Hetal Gada is an Indian film and television child actress. She is known for portraying the lead role of Pari in the hit film Dhanak and Arya Mathur in the serial Aap Ke Aa Jane Se, that airs on Zee TV.

Career
In 2014, Gada guest-starred in an episode of Savdhaan India. 
In 2015, she was cast as the lead in two films, Dhanak as Pari, and Ishani in Chidiya. In the same year, she was cast in Zee TV's series Jamai Raja, Color TV's Code Red and another episode of Savdhaan India. In 2017, she was cast in a third film, Daak Ghar as a character named Sudha. In late 2017, she bagged a recurring role in the soap opera Aap Ke Aa Jane Se as Arya Mathur. She also played a major role as Tejal Patel in famous prime web series Crash Course released in 2022.

Personal life
Gada was born to a casting director Krupa Pandya.

Filmography

Awards and nominations

References

External links 

Indian film actresses
Indian child actresses
Actresses in Hindi cinema
Indian television child actresses
Indian television actresses
Living people
Year of birth missing (living people)